Charles Ledoux  (27 October 1892 – 21 May 1967) was a French bantamweight boxer who was active from 1909 to 1926. While never capturing a world title, he squared off against the best opposition available to him both nationally and internationally. During his career, Ledoux faced the likes of Jim Driscoll, Georges Carpentier, Johnny Coulon, Kid Herman, Kid Williams, Eugène Criqui and Joe Lynch. Ledoux was inducted into the International Boxing Hall of Fame in 2014. He was one on the hardest hitting bantamweights in boxing history, with 43 of his 86 knockouts coming in the first 3 rounds and 16 of them in the first round.

Professional boxing record 
All information in this section is derived from BoxRec, unless otherwise stated.

Official record 

All newspaper decisions are officially regarded as "no decision" bouts and are not counted in the win/loss/draw column.

Unofficial record 

Record with the inclusion of newspaper decisions in the win/loss/draw column.

References

External links 
Charles Ledoux – Professional Boxing Record at BoxRec

Bantamweight boxers
European Boxing Union champions
1892 births
1967 deaths
French male boxers
People from Nevers
Sportspeople from Nièvre